The Florida Sea Dragons was an American professional basketball based in Fort Myers, Florida. The club competed in the now defunct United States Basketball League. The Sea Dragons played from 2000 to 2003 at Germain Arena in Estero, Florida.

References

Defunct basketball teams in Florida
Basketball teams in Florida
United States Basketball League teams
2000 establishments in Florida
2003 disestablishments in Florida
Basketball teams established in 2000
Basketball teams disestablished in 2003
Sports in Fort Myers, Florida